Nathan Benjamin Cameron (born 21 November 1991) is an English professional footballer who plays as a defender for AFC Telford United.

Having progressed through the academy system at Coventry City, Cameron has also represented Bury, and spent time on loan at Nuneaton Town in 2010 and Northampton Town in 2013. He has been capped by England at youth level, appearing once for the under-20 team.

Cameron signed for Wigan Athletic in September 2020 on a short-term contract.

Club career

Coventry City
Born in Birmingham, England, Cameron started his football career at Coventry City and having progressed through the academy, Cameron signed his first professional contract with the club. While progressing through the academy, Cameron was captain for the academy both U16 and U18.

After appearing twice as unused substitute in the league in mid-August, Cameron made his Coventry City debut on 12 August 2009, where he played 15 minutes, in a 1–0 loss against Hartlepool United. After his loan spell at Nuneaton Town came to an end, Cameron signed a one–year contract with the club.

Cameron made his first league start in the opening game of the 2010–11 season, playing 90 minutes, in a 2–0 win over Portsmouth. Soon after, Cameron lost his first team place, due to Aidy Boothroyd's preferring James McPake and Richard Woods' partnership in central defence. Cameron soon given a first team chance around November following McPake and Ben Turner's injury. On 3 January 2011, Cameron then provided assist for Freddy Eastwood to score the club's only goal in the match, in a 2–1 loss against Barnsley. However, as the season progressed towards the end, Cameron soon lost his first team place, but after making 25 appearances, he expected to sign a contract with the club, keeping him until 2014. However, the contract was changed from 2014 to 2013 instead.

After appearing on the substitute bench for several matches, Cameron made his first appearance of the 2011–12 season on 19 September 2011, where he came on as a substitute in the 76th minute, in a 3–0 loss against Ipswich Town. Following a failed loan move to Northampton Town on loan, where he could re–join Boothroyd, Cameron suffered a knee injury soon after and kept him out for months. After returning to the substitute bench unused against Barnsley on 25 February 2012, Cameron made his return, where he made his starts in months, in a 1–1 draw against Crystal Palace. In a 0–0 draw against Watford on 17 March 2012, Cameron had his goal wrongly disallowed, in which could have been his first Coventry City goal; leading to an apology from the officials. However, Cameron ended the season with 14 appearances after being ruled out for the rest of the season with a knee injury and Coventry City was relegated from the Championship.

The start 2012–13 season saw Cameron continued to rehabilitated his knee injury following an operation and returned to training in early–August. Cameron made his first team return on 2 October 2012, where he came on as a substitute in the 69th minute, in a 1–1 draw against Milton Keynes Dons. Cameron then provided assist for Leon Clarke to score the first goal of the game, in a 2–0 win over Bournemouth on 26 February 2013. However, Cameron return to the first team limited his chances and he was an unused substitute for a number of games. Cameron made nine appearances for the club.

At the end of the season, Cameron was among five players to be released by the club.

Nuneaton Town and Northampton Town (loan)
On 31 March 2010, Cameron was loaned out to Nuneaton Town for the rest of the season. Cameron made his Nuneaton Town debut on 5 April 2010, in a 1–0 win over Tiverton Town. Cameron scored his first goal for the club nine days later on 14 August 2010, in a 4–0 win over Stourbridge. Cameron went on to make thirteen appearances and scoring once for Nuneaton Town.

With his first team opportunities limited at Coventry City, just on the substitute bench, Cameron joined League Two side Northampton Town on loan until the end of the season on 26 March 2013. Cameron made his Northampton Town debut three days later on 29 March 2013, coming on as a substitute for Chris Hackett in the 86th minute, in a 1–0 win over Torquay United. After making two starts in both legs against Cheltenham Town in the semi–final play–offs, which Northampton Town won 2–0 on aggregate. Cameron played the whole match of the play-off final defeat to Bradford City. Despite this, Northampton Town were keen on signing Cameron, but the move was later withdrawn.

Bury
After an unsuccessful move to Northampton Town, Cameron joined League Two relegated side Bury on 28 June 2013, signing a two–year contract. Upon joining the club, Cameron couldn't hide his delight moving to Bury, though at the same time he describe the move as 'pretty late' and was given number five shirt.

Cameron made his Bury debut, playing in the central–midfielder, in a 2–0 loss against Chesterfield in the opening game of the season. But in the next match, Cameron received a red card after a second bookable offense, in a 2–1 loss against Oxford United. Two weeks later, on 31 August 2013, Cameron scored his first Bury goal, in a 4–1 win over Cheltenham Town. Cameron added three more goals later in the season against Torquay United, Exeter City and York City. However, Cameron was soon sidelined after being dropped from the first team for two months and was expected to be loaned out as result. However, Cameron managed to stay at the club and made his first team return on 21 April 2014, coming on as a substitute in the last minute, in a 1–0 loss against York City. Despite this, he finished the 2013–14 season, making twenty–seven appearances and scoring four times.

Ahead of the 2014–15 season, Cameron was considered leaving the club, due to limited first team opportunities, but stayed at the club after regaining his first team place and switched shirt from 5 to 27. Cameron's performance soon attract interests from Championship clubs. But the transfer speculation ended when Cameron signed a three–year contract, keeping him until 2017. Cameron scored his first Bury goal of the season, in the first round of the FA Cup, with a 3–1 win over Hemel Hempstead Town on 8 November 2014. Cameron scored again in the quarter final of Football League Trophy, in a 2–1 loss against Tranmere Rovers. Two months later, on 27 January 2015, Cameron then scored his first league goal of the season, in a 1–0 win over Accrington Stanley. Cameron went on to score two more goals later in the season, against Mansfield Town and Cambridge United. Cameron was the ever-present player in the 2014–15 season, as he appeared in every match and helped the club get promoted to League Two. In addition to his good performance to the season, Cameron was awarded for the Bury Times player of the season award.

In the 2015–16 season, Cameron was given the captaincy in the opening game of the season against Doncaster Rovers, which they drew 1–1. From that moment on, Cameron captained in handful of matches throughout the 2015–16 season. By November, Cameron scored three goals against Port Vale, Peterborough United and Wigan Athletic. Cameron continued to be in the first team at Bury until he suffered cartilage damage, in a 5–2 win over Colchester United on 20 February 2016. It was announced that Cameron would be ruled out for the rest of the season after having surgery. Cameron finished the season, making twenty-seven appearances.

Ahead of the 2016–17 season, Cameron continued to recover from his knee injury and made his Bury return on 24 July 2016, in a 1–1 draw against Southport. Cameron played a role in the opening game of the season against Charlton Athletic, where he won a penalty, leading Neil Danns convert the penalty in a 2–0 win. Weeks later, Cameron signed a contract extension, keeping him until 2018.

He was released by Bury at the end of the 2017–18 season.

Former manager David Flitcroft gave Cameron a trial at Mansfield Town in the 2018 close season, however he was injured in the friendly match with fellow East Midlands club Derby County.

On 16 November 2018, Cameron joined League Two club Macclesfield Town on a two-month deal.

Wigan Athletic
Having been on trial for a month, Camerone signed a short-term contract with Wigan Athletic on 18 September 2020.

Non-League
In January 2021, Cameron joined Solihull Moors on a short-term contract. At the end of the season, he signed for National League North club Kidderminster Harriers for the upcoming campaign.

In June 2022, Cameron joined Southern Football League Premier Division Central club Hednesford Town. In February 2023, he signed for National League North bottom side AFC Telford United on a short-term contract until the end of the season.

International career
In February 2011, Cameron was called up by England U20 and made his England U20 debut on 9 February 2011, in a 2–1 loss against France U20.

In July 2011, Cameron, along with his then teammate Jordan Clarke, were left out for the England U20's squad in FIFA U-20 World Cup, which took place in Colombia.

Career statistics

References

External links

1991 births
Living people
Footballers from Birmingham, West Midlands
English footballers
England youth international footballers
Association football defenders
Coventry City F.C. players
Nuneaton Borough F.C. players
Northampton Town F.C. players
Bury F.C. players
Macclesfield Town F.C. players
Wigan Athletic F.C. players
Solihull Moors F.C. players
Kidderminster Harriers F.C. players
Hednesford Town F.C. players
AFC Telford United players
English Football League players
National League (English football) players
Southern Football League players
Black British sportspeople